Somewhere in the Stratosphere is a 2CD/2DVD package released by the American rock band Shinedown. It contains two full recordings of the "Live from Washington State" performance from the "Carnival of Madness" tour, and the Kansas City performance from the "Anything and Everything" Acoustic tour. The 2 DVDs contain the same tracks as the CDs. The album debuted at #83 on the U.S. Billboard 200. The album title is derived from a lyric in the song "Second Chance".

Track list

Disc 1: Live from Washington State (Electric Show)

Disc 2: Live from Kansas City (Acoustic Show)

Personnel
 Brent Smith - lead vocals
 Zach Myers - guitar, backing vocals
 Eric Bass - bass guitar, piano, additional guitar, backing vocals
 Barry Kerch - drums
 Brandon "The Bear" Alanis - (drum tech) xylophone, vibes, percussion, shakers, lap steel guitar, backing vocals
 Ryan (Zilla) Ashurst - (bass tech) bass guitar
 Alan Price - second guitar, backing vocals

Also Will Hoge joins the band for the song "With a Little Help from My Friends", with a horn section. The horn section is not noted in the credits.

Chart positions

References

2011 live albums
2011 video albums
Shinedown albums